Morgan Sulele is the second album by Norwegian pop artist Morgan Sulele, released in 2016. The album contains a combination of former singles and new songs, and has an upbeat and simplistic style, featuring themes surrounding relationships and courtship. The song "Bare min" was written by Peter Filip Koppang and Oddvar Myren.It received mixed reviews, with Sven Oke Bakke labeling it "unbearably bland ukelele-plucking". The album reached a ranking of Number 2 on the VG-lista, Norway's national music ranking publication.

Tracklisting

Awards 
"Bare min" was nominated for the 2015 Spellemann Hit of the Year.

References

2016 albums